Anna Sas (born 6 October 2003) is a Belarusian footballer who plays as a midfielder for 2. Frauen Bundesliga club Carl Zeiss Jena and the Belarus women's national team.

References

2003 births
Living people
Belarusian women's footballers
Belarusian expatriate sportspeople in Germany
Women's association football midfielders
FC Minsk (women) players
Belarus women's international footballers
Expatriate women's footballers in Germany